Altobello is both a given name and a surname.

Notable people with the given name include:
Altobello de Averoldi (died 1531), Italian Roman Catholic prelate
Altobello Melone (c. 1490–1491 – before 1543), Italian painter
Altobello Persio (1507–1593), Italian sculptor

Notable people with the surname include:
Emil Altobello (born 1949), American politician 
Francesco Antonio Altobello (1637–1703), Italian painter
Gerry Altobello, Canadian politician